Joseph Pascal François (1853-1914) was Governor General for various colonies in Second French Colonial Empire under the Third Republic.

Titles held

References

French colonial governors and administrators
Governors of French Polynesia
Governors of French India
People of the French Third Republic
1853 births
1914 deaths